North Dakota Highway 89 (ND 89) is a  north–south state highway in the U.S. state of North Dakota. ND 89's southern terminus is at the edge of the Cavalier Air Force Station, and the northern terminus is at ND 5 east of Langdon.

Highway 89 crosses the Tongue River near its southern end.

Major intersections

References

089
Transportation in Pembina County, North Dakota